Thanh Hoa may refer to several places in Vietnam, including:

 Thanh Hóa Province
 Thanh Hóa, the provincial capital of Thanh Hóa Province
 Thanh Hóa, Quảng Bình, a rural commune of Tuyên Hóa District
 Thạnh Hóa District, a rural district of Long An Province
 Thạnh Hóa, a township and capital of Thạnh Hóa District

See also
 Thanh Hóa Bridge across the Sông Mã river near Thanh Hóa